Francesco di Maria (1623–1690) was an Italian painter of the Baroque period, active mainly in Naples. He was a pupil of the painter Domenichino. Maria was an early mentor of Francesco Solimena, Giacomo del Pò, and Paolo de Matteis.

References

External links

1623 births
1690 deaths
17th-century Neapolitan people
17th-century Italian painters
Italian male painters
Painters from Naples
Italian Baroque painters